The Vickers Type 56 Victoria was a British biplane freighter and troop transport aircraft used by the Royal Air Force. The Victoria flew for the first time in 1922 and was selected for production over the Armstrong Whitworth Awana.

Design and development
The Victoria was a twin-engined biplane transport with a conventional landing gear with a tailskid. The design mated a similar fuselage of the earlier Vernon transport with the wing of the Virginia bomber, which was developed in parallel. It was also powered by two Napier Lion engines. The enclosed cabin had room for 24 troops on collapsible canvas seats arranged along the sides of the fuselage.

In April 1921 two prototypes were ordered by the Air Ministry to Specification 5/20. The first prototype, allocated serial number J6860, was built as a Type 56 and designated a Victoria I, the second J6861 was built as a Type 81 Victoria II. The Type 56 had two  Napier Lion engines with large frontal radiators and were fitted directly onto the lower mainplanes, the fuel tanks were placed under the inboard section of the bottom mainplane. The prototype J6860 first flew from Brooklands, Surrey on 22 September 1922. The Type 81 flew in January 1923, and initially differed only in having the fuel tanks under the top mainplane. It was later modified by replacing the flat sided engine cowling with more streamlined nacelles with the radiators between the undercarriage legs, as fitted in the Virginia II bomber.

In March 1925, it was decided to place an order for 15 production aircraft. By this time, the Virginia design had evolved to incorporate swept-back wings, and the production Victoria IIIs incorporated this change. Another improvement first introduced in the Virginia was the introduction of metal structures instead of the all-wooden airframes of the early aircraft, with an order being placed for a prototype Victoria with a metal structure (serial number J9250) in September 1927, this being delivered in October 1928. The metal airframe proved much more suitable for the hot and humid areas where the Victoria served, with Victoria IV and Vs with metal structures produced by conversion and new production respectively. The final version was the Mark VI, which substituted modern, more powerful Bristol Pegasus radial engines for the Napier Lions. The Vickers Valentia was a further improved version with a stronger structure, capable of operating at higher weights.

97 Victorias were built, many of which were later converted into Valentias.

Operational history

Deliveries of the Victoria III started on 23 February 1926, with the type replacing Vernons and Vimys with 70 Squadron in Iraq and 216 Squadron in Egypt that year. Eight Victorias of 70 Squadron played an important part in the Kabul Airlift of November 1928–February 1929, when in severe winter conditions, RAF aircraft evacuated diplomatic staff and their dependents together with members of the Afghan royal family endangered by a civil war. Victorias were used to ferry troops to potential trouble spots in Iraq and elsewhere, flying reinforcements to Palestine in 1929 and Jordan in 1930 and from Egypt to Cyprus in 1931.

The Victorias of the two operational squadrons also made a number of long range training flights, such as return trips from Cairo to Aden in 1931, and helped to pioneer air routes for Imperial Airways' Handley Page HP.42 airliners. One Victoria was used as a blind flying trainer by the Central Flying School, being fitted with two sets of controls and instruments in a blanked off cabin. The Victoria continued in service until 1935, although many were converted to Valentias, which remained in use until well into the Second World War.

Variants
Type 56 Victoria Mk I
 The first prototype. Powered by two  Napier Lion IAX W12 engines.
Type 81 Victoria Mk II
 The second prototype.
Type 117 Victoria Mk III
 The first production version. Military transport aircraft for the RAF. Powered by 450 hp Napier Lion II engines. 46 built.
Type 145 Victoria Mk IV
 Metal wing structure. One prototype powered by Bristol Jupiter radials. Thirteen Lion-engined conversions from earlier marks.
Type 169 Victoria Mk V
 New production aircraft with metal structure, powered by two  Napier Lion XIB engines. 37 new-built.
Type 262 Victoria Mk VI
 Final production - powered by  Bristol Pegasus IIL3 engines instead of Lions. 11 new-build, 23 by conversion.

Operators
 
 Royal Air Force
 No. 70 Squadron RAF (1924-1935 at RAF Hinaidi, Iraq)
 No. 216 Squadron RAF (1925-1935 at RAF Heliopolis, Egypt)

Specifications (Victoria V)

See also

References

Citations

Bibliography
 
 
 
 
 
 
Sims, Charles. "Talkback". Air Enthusiast. No. 13, August–November 1980. p. 79. 
 

1920s British military transport aircraft
Victoria
Biplanes
Aircraft first flown in 1922
Twin piston-engined tractor aircraft